Wikipedia's main articles on this topic are at:

 Food
 Drink

For the British television series, see Food and Drink.

Main topic articles